Jarno Hams (born 1974) is a strongman from the Netherlands. He participated in the World's Strongest Man in 2002 and 2003, but failed to qualify for the finals both times. Hams is a 7-time winner of Strongest Man of the Netherlands.

Early life
Hams was born in Hengelo, Overijssel to a Dutch father and Finnish mother and grew up in Vroomshoop. One of his greatest hobbies is soccer; he played 19 years for the local soccer club VV Vroomshoopse Boys.

Strongman
The first strongman contest he competed in was the 'Sterkste man van Oost-Nederland' (Strongest Man of East Netherlands) in 1996 where he finished third. After this he followed some training lessons from Berend Veneberg, then the Strongest Man of the Netherlands.

He managed his first podium finish at the Strongest Man of the Netherlands in 1999 where he finished third. In 2001 he placed second behind Wout Zijlstra. It would take him until 2004 to finally win the tournament for the first time.

He was invited to the 2002 World's Strongest Man and 2003 World's Strongest Man competitions but did not manage to get past the qualifying heats.

Hams competed together with Wout Zijlstra in the World's Strongest Team competition in 2001 where they finished third. In 2006 he would go on to win the contest with Edwin Hakvoort.

Hams competed in the IFSA Strongman World Championships in 2005 in the qualifying heats and 2007 where he placed 12th in the finals.

Due to an injury, he could not defend his title during the Strongest Man of the Netherlands on July 12, 2009 in Vroomshoop.
Hams would go on to win Strongest Man of the Netherlands in 2010 and 2012.

Jarno's brother Eric Hams has also competed in Strongest Man of the Netherlands on several occasions.

Hams competes regularly in the Strongman Champions League series, achieving a podium finish in 2011 in the Canary Islands and in the Netherlands in 2012. In the 2012 SCL Holland event, Jarno set a new Dutch record in the log lift with a lift of 182.5 kg.

Jarno won his 7th Strongest Man of the Netherlands title on July 18, 2012. This win ties him with Berend Veneberg for most victories in the contest.

Personal life
Jarno worked as a truck driver and as a doorman for a discothèque in Hengelo.

Personal records
Squat - 340 kg
Deadlift - 380 kg (320 x 7)
Bench press – 180 kg x 7
Military press - 210 kg (national record)
Log Lift - 185 kg (former national record, together with Alex Moonen, November 4, 2012)
Atlas Stones - 210 kg

Source

Honours
1st place Strongest Man of the Netherlands (2004)
1st place Strongest Man of the Netherlands (2005)
1st place World's Strongest Team, with Edwin Hakvoort (2006)
1st place Strongest Man of the Netherlands (2006)
1st place Strongest Man of the Netherlands (2007)
12th place World Championship (IFSA) (2007)
1st place Strongest Man of the Netherlands (2008)
Qualifying heat World's Strongest Man 2002 and 2003.
1st place Strongest Man of the Netherlands (2010)
1st place Strongest Man of the Netherlands (2012)
4th place Strongest Man of the Netherlands (2014)
1st place Strongest Team of the Netherlands (2015) with his younger brother Eric Hams

References

External links
 Personal website 
 Jarno Hams on realdutchpower.nl

1974 births
Living people
Dutch strength athletes
Dutch people of Finnish descent
Sportspeople from Hengelo
People from Vroomshoop